The Oman national basketball team represents Oman in international men's basketball and is regulated by the Oman Basketball Association (OBA), the governing body for basketball in the country.

Competitive record

FIBA Asia Cup

References

basketball
Sport in Oman
Men's national basketball teams
1987 establishments in Oman
Basketball teams established in 1987